Maddock is the obsolete term for earthworm or maggot. It also may refer to:

Maddock (surname)
Maddock, North Dakota, a US city

See also
Maddocks, a surname
Mattock, a multi-use hand tool
 Madoc (disambiguation)